The city of Saint Paul, Minnesota held an election on November 2, 2021, to elect the mayor. It was held with ranked-choice voting, and there was no primary election. Few candidates filed to challenge incumbent mayor Melvin Carter III, and he easily won a second term with over 60% of first-preference votes.

Candidates

Declared
Melvin Carter III, incumbent mayor (DFL)
Miki Frost, mentor for troubled youth (Independent)
Dino Guerin, investigative assistant at the Ramsey County Sheriff's Department, former Ramsey County commissioner, former Saint Paul District Fire Chief, and former city councillor
Bill Hosko, artist, cafe owner, and perennial candidate
Dora Jones-Robinson, gun control activist
Paul Langenfeld, personal care attendant and former vice president of the Highland Park district council
Abu Nayeem, data analyst and community organizer
Scott Evans Wergin, biochemist

Declined
Pat Harris, former city councillor and candidate for mayor in 2017 (DFL) (endorsed Carter)

Endorsements

Results

Notes

References

Mayoral elections in Saint Paul, Minnesota
Saint Paul mayoral
Saint Paul